The Montserrat national football team represents Montserrat in Football. Football is the second most popular sport in Montserrat, after cricket. The team plays at the Blakes Estate Stadium. The Montserrat football team was formed in 1973, and has entered the World Cup qualifiers since the 2002 edition, being eliminated in the first round on each occasion.

Due to the heavy volcanic activity on the island since 1995, the team has only played a handful of matches, and most of those have been away from home. Their only victories were against neighboring Anguilla in the qualifying tournament of the 1995 Caribbean Cup, winning 3–2 at home and 1–0 away. Apart from one draw against Anguilla, all their other matches before 2018 have been lost. Since then, however, Montserrat has proven more competitive.

On June 30, 2002, the day of the 2002 World Cup Final, Montserrat, then the lowest ranked team in the world, played against the second lowest ranked team, Bhutan, in a friendly match known as "The Other Final"; losing 4–0.

History
The Montserrat national team is one of the newest in international football, having played its first senior match on 10 May 1991 during the 1991 Caribbean Cup tournament. The team suffered a 3–0 defeat against Saint Lucia. The team's next match was against Anguilla; securing a 1-1 draw. 
Montserrat once again entered the Caribbean Cup the following year but were once more knocked out in the group stage, with heavy defeats against Saint Kitts and Nevis and Antigua and Barbuda. They were drawn against the same two teams in the 1994 Caribbean Cup, again being eliminated in the tournament's group stage, conceding 17 goals in two matches. In 1994, the Montserrat Football Association (MFA) was formed. Like all other football teams based in the Caribbean, the MFA became a member of CONCACAF.

On 26 March 1995, Montserrat played their first ever home international match. They defeated Anguilla 3–2, also achieving their first win in the process. The team beat Anguilla again in the next fixture to ensure progress to the Second Qualifying Round of the 1995 Caribbean Cup. The 1–0 win in the second leg would be their only clean sheet in international football and their most recent victory for the next seventeen years. The side exited the competition in the next stage, losing 20–0 against Saint Vincent and the Grenadines. 

Soon afterwards, the Soufrière Hills volcano became active and the eruptions destroyed Plymouth, the capital of Montserrat, severely disrupting all football on the island. Despite the lack of football action, the MFA became a member of FIFA in 1996. However, it was a further three years before the Montserrat team played another match. This was mostly because many of the island's footballers had emigrated away from the area, many of them to England.

After a four-year hiatus, the team entered the 1999 Caribbean Nations Cup. They were knocked out in the preliminary round of the tournament, losing 6–1 to the British Virgin Islands. Due to the volcanic activity on the island, Montserrat had been unable to enter the FIFA World Cup 1998 tournament, so their entry to the 2002 World Cup was their first; but it was not a success as they were defeated 6–1 by the Dominican Republic. In 2001, the MFA visited The Football Association to raise money for a new stadium. Shortly affer this the Blakes Estate Stadium was opened. The team's next match was on 30 June 2002, the day of the World Cup Final, when Montserrat played Bhutan in a game known as "The Other Final". The friendly match between the two lowest-ranked teams in the world ended with a 4–0 win for Bhutan in front of 15,000 fans in Thimphu.

Montserrat entered the World Cup qualifiers once more for the 2006 competition, but again lost in the first qualifying round, this time losing 20–0 against Bermuda. Montserrat then competed in the 2005 Caribbean Cup, but once more failed to progress past the preliminary round. In 2008, they were defeated 7–1 by Suriname in the first qualifying round of the 2010 World Cup.

The team played a friendly match against a Network Rail XI was played on May 19, 2012, ending in a 4–4 draw.

Montserrat achieved their first victory since 1995 and their first ever victory since joining FIFA, beating the British Virgin Islands 7–0 in a 2012 Caribbean Championship qualifying match.

Montserrat's fortunes changed dramatically in 2018 with the arrival of Willie Donachie and launch of the CONCACAF Nations League. The side won three of their four qualifying games, but missed out on qualification for the 2019 CONCACAF Gold Cup on goal difference. The team went on to take second place in their group in the inaugural season with two wins, draws, and losses each, thus keeping their place in the second tier.

World rankings
The poor results of the team has seen them often frequenting at the lower end of the FIFA World Rankings. The loss to Bhutan in "The Other Final" saw them fall to 203rd in the rankings, becoming the worst-ranked side in the world. After the addition of another two teams to FIFA, Montserrat achieved a new low of 205th between July and October 2004. In July 2006, they achieved a record high rank of 196th but they fell down to 198th the following month. Success in the qualifying tournament for the CONCACAF Nations League and the first edition of the league proper saw them rise to 184th.

The team have also languished at the lower reaches of the unofficial World Football Elo Ratings, which ranks teams directly based on their match results.

Colours
Since the team's first match in 1991, Montserrat have usually worn a first-choice kit of green, either plain green or green and white hoops. Currently, the away kit is a red jersey, shorts and socks.

Recent results and forthcoming fixtures

The following is a list of match results in the last 12 months, as well as any future matches that have been scheduled.

2022

2023

Coaching staff

Coaching history

  Paul Morris (2000–2002)
  William Lewis (2002–2004)
   Scott Cooper (2004)
  Ruel Fox (2004)
  Cecil Lake (2008)
  Kenny Dyer (2008–2013)
  Lenny Hewlett (2013–2015)
  Willie Donachie (2018–2022)
  Matt Lockwood (2022–)

Current squad
The following players were called up to the squad for the 2022–23 CONCACAF Nations League B matches against Guyana on 5 June 2022, Haiti on 7 June 2022 and Guyana on 12 and 14 June 2022.

Caps and goals correct as of 12 June 2022, after the game against Haiti.

Recent call-ups
The following players have been called up to the Montserrat squad in the last 12 months.

Player records

Players in bold are still active with Montserrat.

Competitive record

FIFA World Cup

CONCACAF Gold Cup

CONCACAF Nations League

Caribbean Cup

Head-to-head record

Note: teams in italic indicates that teams are not FIFA members.

References

External links
RSSSF archive of Montserrat national team results
National Football Teams
Guardian article which refers to Montserrat's 2012 match against a Network Rail XI

 
Caribbean national association football teams